Baron Russell of Killowen can refer to three law lords, father, son and grandson:

Charles Russell, Baron Russell of Killowen (1832–1900), Lord Chief Justice of England and Wales and father of Frank Russell
Frank Russell, Baron Russell of Killowen (1867–1946), Lord of Appeal in Ordinary and father of Charles Ritchie Russell
Charles Ritchie Russell, Baron Russell of Killowen (1908–1986), Lord of Appeal in Ordinary